The 2006 İstanbul Cup was a women's tennis tournament played on outdoor clay courts. It was the second edition of the Istanbul Cup, and part of the WTA Tier III tournaments of the 2006 WTA Tour. It was held in İstanbul from 22 through 28 May 2006. Fourth-seeded Shahar Pe'er won the singles title.

Points and prize money

Point distribution

Prize money

* per team

Singles main-draw entrants

Seeds

1 Rankings as of 15 May 2006

Other entrants
The following players received wildcards into the singles main draw:
  Irina Kotkina
  Alicia Molik
  İpek Şenoğlu

The following players received entry from the qualifying draw:
  Tamira Paszek
  Urszula Radwańska
  Magdaléna Rybáriková
  Angelique Widjaja

Retirements
  Melinda Czink (gastroenteritis)
  Eleni Daniilidou (left abdominal strain)
  Irina Kotkina (right elbow inflammation)

Doubles main-draw entrants

Seeds

1 Rankings as of 15 May 2006

Other entrants
The following pair received entry from the qualifying draw:
  Agnieszka Radwańska /  Urszula Radwańska

The following pair received entry as lucky losers:
  Vasilisa Davydova /  Olga Panova

Withdrawals
Before the tournament
  Melinda Czink (gastroenteritis) → replaced by Davydova/Panova

During the tournament
  Ashley Harkleroad (right shoulder inflammation)
  Meghann Shaughnessy (right ankle sprain)

Finals

Singles

  Shahar Pe'er defeated  Anastasia Myskina, 1–6, 6–3, 7–6(7–3)
It was the 3rd title for Pe'er in her singles career.

Doubles

  Alona Bondarenko /  Anastasiya Yakimova defeated  Sania Mirza /  Alicia Molik, 6–2, 6–4
It was the 1st title for both Bondarenko and Yakimova in their respective doubles careers.

References

External links
 Official Results Archive (ITF)
 Official Results Archive (WTA)

Istanbul Cup
İstanbul Cup
Istanbul
May 2006 sports events in Turkey